The National Cheerleading Championship, commonly known as NCC, is the Philippines’ first and oldest National cheerleading competition. The annual competition, which started in 2006, is modeled after U.S. competitive cheerleading competitions.

NCC is a member of the Philippine Cheerleading Alliance (PCA), the official governing body for cheerleading in the Philippines. The PCA is the official sanctioned national federation recognized by the International Cheer Union (ICU), the world governing body for the sport of cheerleading.

Background

History
National Cheerleading Championship started as a one-day invitational cheerleading championship in 2006. It started with two divisions, College and High School divisions, composed of ten teams and, was held in Araneta Coliseum. The inaugural event was judged by invited American judges, such as Joe Jackson of the Cheerleaders of America (COA), as well with known Filipino names in Philippine cheerleading.

In 2008, twenty nine teams from all over the country participated in the competition securing its title as the only national cheerleading competition in the Philippines.

By 2009, it first held regional qualifiers among three key cities in the Philippines. By 2010, with eighty five squads joining the qualifiers, the regional qualifiers was expanded to six; divisions were also expanded to six. In 2011, the divisions were expanded more to eight, and the National Dance Championship was inaugurated with 23 teams participating.

In 2018, the NCC saw more than 200 teams participate in the Nationals and also in 2018 NCC Philippines now allows international teams competing from China for the first time.

Mission
The National Cheerleading Championship's mission are:
 To promote the sport of International Competitive cheerleading as a means to raise the caliber of local cheerleading
 To promote the ideas of good sportsmanship, personal integrity and accountability, team cooperation and community activities
 To develop cheerleaders that possess world-class cheerleading skills and abilities
 To develop cheerleading coaches adept and knowledgeable in world class training methods and expertise
 To standardize and inculcate the rules and regulations of competitive cheerleading and develop world-class and international quality training methods and skills
 To establish the National Cheerleading Organization to provide products and services and a means for networking for the cheerleading community
 To hold annually the country’s Premiere Cheerleading Tournament as a means to showcase the country’s cheerleading skills and talents
 To be able to send a Filipino contingent to international cheerleading competitions.

Vision
The National Cheerleading Championship's vision is to become the premier organization for the advancement of cheerleading as a sport through developing and training world-class Filipino cheerleading athletes by providing international-standard training methods, services, and facilities, and a venue for a national cheerleading tournament.

The divisions throughout the seasons

Cheerleading
The inaugural event started in 2006 at Araneta Coliseum with 10 participating teams (5 College and 5 High School Teams) and as of the 2018 Season, more than 10 division competitions has been established and the poms competition will soon be added as new division for Cheer competitions.

Since 2018, most teams who compete are from well-known schools (especially College Level 6 Divisions) have at-least tried to compete at the National Finals. The NCC Cheerleading Competition held every mid-to-late March, since some schools are off-season, some schools can't compete at the National Finals due to conflicting schedules (such as schools competing at NCAA Cheerleading Competition), as well as a short time for teams to prepare for ICU Worlds in April (in case of National University in 2015 ICU worlds but managed to compete at NCC Finals and ICU World Finals that year.)

Today, before you can enter and compete at NCC Finals, the team must Qualify through NCC Regional Qualifiers in different areas of the country depending on the location and proximity of the competing team/school. For example: Teams that are based in NCR must compete first in NCC NCR Qualifiers (except Open Coed/All-Girl Elite Divisions) before going to compete at National Finals.

Here are the list of Regional Qualifiers for NCC National Finals as of 2018-2019 Season:

Here are the list of winners in each seasons since inaugural year in 2006, noted as more teams competed starting 2006 and broaden the competition in 2019. Poms division started in Season 13 (2017) and more divisions will be added soon as cheerleading is being developed in the Philippines.

Poms Division 
In Season 13 (2017) edition started the Poms Division and further expanded in 2018.

Stunts
Partner Stunts division opened in 2010, while the Group Stunts division started the following year and both division since 2012.

Dance
Inaugurated the competition since 2010-2011 Season.

References

External links
 Official Website
 National Cheerleading Championship on Facebook
 National Cheerleading Championship on Twitter
 National Cheerleading Championship on YouTube

 
Cheerleading competitions
Sports in the Philippines
National championships in the Philippines